= Church of the Nativity, Sosnovskoye =

Church in Kamensky District, Sverdlovsk Oblast, Russia

Church of the Nativity
- Церковь Рождества Христова
- Interactive map of the Church of the Nativity area

General information
- Location: Sosnovskoye
- Coordinates: 56°26′38″N 61°14′53″E
- Construction started: 1861
- Completed: 1864

Church of the Nativity is an Orthodox church in Sosnovskoye village, Sverdlovsk oblast.

The church was granted the status of regional significance on 28 December 2001 (the Sverdlovsk Oblast Government Decree No. 859). The object number of cultural heritage of regional significance is 661710759340005.

== History ==
The red brick building stands on the shore of Lake Sosnovsky in the center of the village.

The first wooden building was laid in 1861. The monastery was built until 1864, in which the church was consecrated in the Nativity of Christ. The building was completely destroyed by a fire in 1866. The capital stone temple was built in 1915-1916. In 1937, the priest of the church was shot, Panov Mikhail Stepanovich. In 1939 the church was closed.

Restorative work and services began in 2004.

== Architecture ==
The building is an original and rare for the Ural region monument of church architecture of the late "Byzantine style".

The voluminous composition of the building is an octagonal temple part with an adjoining five-edged apse, a porch and a developed covered porch, topped by a bell tower.

The system of facade sections reflects the planning structure of the building and follows the rules of order tectonics. Collected in bundles of a full order column (with pedestals) fix the corners of the temple octagon and the porch, visually support the archivolts and entablature covering the building along the perimeter.

The dome, "Byzantine" by the nature of the design, is crowned with the head of the "Russian" style. The composition of the bell tower was built on a contrasting change in diameter and height from the lower tier to the upper tier of the bell, topped with a hill of kokoshniks and a two-tier bulbous glaucoma.

Light and heavy, almost devoid of decor volumes of the temple are convincingly compared with the typical late stage of the "Byzantine style" freedom of interpretation of prototypes. The internal space of the octagonal in terms of the temple is dynamic, and it does not lack harmony and unity. The leading theme in the interior design is the arch. Large and small arched niches, alternating with each other, form a closed arcade in the circle, supporting a dome with a light lamp.

== Literature ==
- Свод памятников истории и культуры Свердловской области. Vol. 2. Екатеринбург: Сократ. 2008. p. 648. ISBN 978-5-88664-323-7 – via ред. В.Е.Звагельская.
- Бурлакова Н.Н. (2011). Забытые храмы Свердловской области. Екатеринбург: Сократ. pp. 128–129. ISBN 978-5-88664-395-4.
- Приходы и церкви Екатеринбургской епархии. Екатеринбург: Братство Св. Праведного Симеона Верхотурского Чудотворца. 1902. p. 647.
